Ossolin  is a village in the administrative district of Gmina Liw, within Węgrów County, Masovian Voivodeship, in east-central Poland.

The village has a population of 130.

References

Ossolin